The 2003 Southern Conference baseball tournament was held at Joseph P. Riley Jr. Park in Charleston, South Carolina, from May 21 through 24. Top seeded  won the tournament and earned the Southern Conference's automatic bid to the 2003 NCAA Division I baseball tournament. It was Western Carolina's ninth tournament win, the most in SoCon history.

The tournament used a double-elimination format. Only the top eight teams participate, so East Tennessee State, Appalachian State and Wofford were not in the field.

Seeding

Bracket

All-Tournament Team

References 

Tournament
Southern Conference Baseball Tournament
Southern Conference base
Southern Conference baseball tournament